Poppins is a 2012 Indian Malayalam-language anthology film directed by V. K. Prakash. It stars ten lead actors, appearing as five couples; the characters are played by Kunchacko Boban and Nithya Menen, Jayasurya and Meghna Raj, Indrajith and Padmapriya, Shankar Ramakrishnan and Mythili, and Siddique and Ann Augustine. The film was shot with two cameras at the same time handled by Jomon T. John and Arun.

The film is an adaptation of the Sahitya Akademi award-winning play 18 Natakangal by Jayaprakash Kuloor. Prakash had already adapted this play into a Kannada film titled Aidondla Aidu. The story is centred on man-woman relationships, which is weaved into a single story encapsulating the struggles of a filmmaker, exploring different facets of the institution called marriage. Nithya Menen and Padmapriya reprised their role from the Kannada film.

Plot
All the tales revolve around the relationships between a husband and wife and although each explores different facets of the marital relationship, at their core they involve communication and the consequences of misconception.

Cast

Production
It is a new thought, that the director wanted his critically acclaimed film Aidondla Aidu to be made into Malayalam. After completing Trivandrum Lodge, the director wanted to try a different Aidondla Aidu.
The director was selective with choosing hardworking young and character suiting actors, Kunchacko Boban and Nithya Menen were chosen to play a pivotal couple, and Jayasurya and Meghana Raj were chosen to play a supporting couple,  this is the second time the pair have come together first being the director's Beautiful. Jayasurya was cast again after V. K. Prakash's Trivandrum Lodge, in which he played the lead role. Padmapriya and Nithya Menen were chosen to reprise their roles from the Kannada film Aidu Ondla Aidu.
The shooting of the film began on 10 June 2012, in Bangalore. Jomon T. John is the cinematographer. The film was shot in Bangalore and Trivandrum in two schedules.

Soundtrack
The audio release of poppins by V. K. Prakash was a star-studded affair with the entire cast and other guests attending the function. Among the entire cast, Jayasurya, Meera Nandan, Aparna Nair and Sarayu were present. Ratheesh Vegha's music was the highlight of the day. He had also penned the lyrics of the songs, G. Venugopal and Sithara lent their voices for the songs. The Audio release was officially carried out by East Coast Vijayan and the CD was first given to Shankar Ramakrishnan by Jayasurya. East Coast Vijayan had coordinated the entire function than held on 24 November 2012. Nithya Menon sings the Malayalam version of the same song she sang for in "Aidu Ondla Aidu".

Reception
The film opened to negative reviews from critics and audiences alike. Sify.com gave the verdict "Below Average" and said, "Poppins is a lazy film, which takes the viewer for a ride. Unlike the sweet that it has named after, this one is disturbingly tasteless and has been made without much honesty." Paresh C Palicha of Rediff.com rated the film two out of five start and concluded his review saying that the film is a "very bland one."

References

2012 films
Indian films based on plays
Indian romantic comedy-drama films
2010s Malayalam-language films
Malayalam remakes of Kannada films
Films shot in Bangalore
Films shot in Thiruvananthapuram
Films directed by V. K. Prakash
2012 romantic comedy-drama films